Prostars FC is a Canadian soccer team based in Brampton, Ontario. The organization was founded in 2013. The club plays in the semi-professional League1 Ontario, part of the third division in the Canadian soccer league system in both the men's and women's divisions. The team play their home games at Victoria Park Stadium in Brampton, Ontario. The team's colours are blue for home games and white for away games.

History

ProStars FC was founded as Pro Stars Soccer Academy in 2013. The key philosophy for ProStars is to develop, teach and promote Academy and Professional soccer to all ages, in a safe and healthy environment. Integrated in this is the building of self-esteem, self-confidence, teamwork, respect for self and others, and the inherent benefits of physical exercise.

Successes of the academy did not go unnoticed as a steady stream of players were invited to try-outs for professional soccer teams in Europe.

They added teams in the men's and women's divisions of League1 Ontario in 2015. They departed the women's division after only one season, but re-joined for the 2022 season.

The three Mississauga-based League1 Ontario teams—ProStars FC, Sigma FC, and North Mississauga SC—compete annually for the Credit River Cup, awarded by the Sauga City Collective supporters group, with the team's matches against each other during the L1O deciding the victor. However, in 2021, ProStars committed to having their home in Brampton, they were removed from the Credit River Cup. They returned to the competition in 2022, winning their first Credit River Cup that season. They also qualified for the League1 Ontario playoffs for the first time in 2022.

Seasons 
Men

Women

Notable former players
The following players have either played at the professional or international level, either before or after playing for the League1 Ontario team:

Men

Women

References

External links
 
 

League1 Ontario teams
2008 establishments in Ontario
Association football clubs established in 2008
Brampton
Sport in Mississauga